Torrecilla Alta is a barrio in the municipality of Canóvanas, Puerto Rico. Its population in 2010 was 6,612.

Features
Torrecilla Alta in Canóvanas shares a border with Torrecillas Alta in Loíza, a neighboring municipality. Both are near mangroves and the Río Grande de Loíza. Alligators are known to roam the areas near the mangroves and when discovered, the creatures are moved to a location managed by the Department of Resources.

Sectors
Barrios (which are roughly comparable to minor civil divisions) in turn are further subdivided into smaller local populated place areas/units called sectores (sectors in English). The types of sectores may vary, from normally sector to urbanización to reparto to barriada to residencial, among others.

The following sectors are in Torrecilla Alta barrio:

See also

 List of communities in Puerto Rico
 List of barrios and sectors of Canóvanas, Puerto Rico

References

External links

Barrios of Canóvanas, Puerto Rico